Juan Pérez de la Riva (1913-1976) was a Cuban historian known for his studies of the coolie trade on the island. He was professor of humanities at the University of Havana.

Selected publications
 Los culíes chinos en Cuba
 Conquista del espacio cubano
 El barracón y otros ensayos (1973)
 Para la historia de la gente sin historia (1976)

References 

1913 births
1976 deaths
20th-century Cuban historians